Henry Loney (26 April 1893 – 2 September 1974) was a Scottish footballer who played for Falkirk, Alloa Athletic (two spells, the first while the club was in the Central League) and Dumbarton during the 1920s. He was the cousin of Scotland international Willie Loney.

References 

Scottish footballers
Dumbarton F.C. players
Falkirk F.C. players
Alloa Athletic F.C. players
Scottish Football League players
1893 births
1974 deaths
Association football wing halves
Denny Hibernian F.C. players
Scottish Junior Football Association players
People from Denny, Falkirk
Footballers from Falkirk (council area)